Carl Louis Nippert (October 11, 1852 – September 5, 1904) was a German-American engineer and politician, who served as the 26th lieutenant governor of Ohio in 1902.

Nippert was born in Frankfurt to American parents, Louis and Meta Nippert. His father was from Cincinnati, Ohio, and was sent to Frankfurt to run a Methodist Episcopal Church seminary. The father returned to Walnut Hills, Cincinnati in the 1870s.

Nippert studied engineering at the  universities of Karlsruhe, Germany, and Zürich, Switzerland. After finishing his studies in 1874, he started working as an engineer in Frankfurt, Germany. In 1876 he migrated to the United States to work on the construction of the world fair in Philadelphia.

Nippert worked as a school teacher (1877–1889) and principal (after 1891) in Cincinnati. During this time he advocated the German language. He graduated from Cincinnati Law School, In 1891 he became a lawyer. Eight years later he became a member of the Ohio State Senate for the Republican party.

In 1901, Nippert was elected lieutenant governor of Ohio. He began his term January 1902. A vacancy opened for the Hamilton County Probate Judge, and Governor Nash appointed Nippert to the seat on May 1, 1902. He was elected to a three-year term on the court in 1903.

In the United States, Nippert was a member of several German associations. Nippert was a Freemason and member of the B.P.O.E.

Nippert married Elsie Hitscherich of Karlsruhe, and later married Katie Brill of Cincinnati on July 25, 1889. They had one daughter, who died in childhood. Nippert died of heart disease in 1904.

Nippert Stadium at the University of Cincinnati is named for his nephew, James Gamble Nippert.

References

 H. Dvorak, Biographisches Lexikon der Deutschen Burschenschaft, Bd. 1, Teil 4, Heidelberg: 2000. 

1852 births
1904 deaths
Lieutenant Governors of Ohio
Ohio state court judges
University of Cincinnati College of Law alumni
German emigrants to the United States
Ohio lawyers
Republican Party Ohio state senators
Politicians from Cincinnati
University of Zurich alumni
Karlsruhe Institute of Technology alumni
Burials at Spring Grove Cemetery
19th-century American politicians
19th-century American judges